Dutch West Indian Americans or Dutch Antillean Americans are Americans of Dutch Antillean descent. According to the 2010 Census Bureau figures there were 54,377 Americans under the category of "Dutch West Indian".

In the 2000 US Census, the number of Americans reported whose origins are in the Dutch West Indian was of 35,359. In this Census (and to difference of the 2010 US Census whose Dutch West Indian ethnics were not mentioned of individual way) a total of 1,970 people affirmed just be of Aruban descent, while only 352 people claimed descent from people of St. Maarten.

Immigrants from the  Dutch West Indies came to the United States in small waves throughout the 20th century and largely settled in Oklahoma and Texas, which today are home to 60% of the Dutch West Indian American population. Dutch West Indian Americans comprise 0.05% of the Texas population, more than three times the comparable national share — the highest location quotient of any ancestry in the state. 

Cities with the largest Dutch West Indian populations include New York City, particularly in the Flatbush section of Brooklyn; Oklahoma City; Dallas; Houston; Amarillo; and the Lubbock and McAllen areas.

Notable people
Maureen Bunyan (Aruba)
Hildward Croes (Aruba)
Shad Gaspard (Curaçao)
Daniel De Leon (Curaçao)
Jim Jones (rapper) (Aruba)
 Niesha Butler (Aruba)

References 

 
Caribbean American